My Intuition is Taiwanese Mandopop artist Rainie Yang's debut Mandarin solo studio album. It was released by Sony Music Taiwan on 9 September 2005. It sold more than 1.5 million copies in East and Southeast Asia. 

The literal translation of the Chinese title "曖昧" suggests that a man and woman are involved romantically but the status or nature of their relationship has not been clarified to each other or to others, and therefore in an ambiguous state.

The album contains ten tracks, two of which are featured in Taiwanese drama, Devil Beside You, as well as the Mandarin version of "True Blue", the theme song for Astro Boy. A second edition of the album was released on 11 November 2005 that included a VCD with five music videos.

The album was awarded one of the Top 10 Selling Mandarin Albums of the Year at the 2005 IFPI Hong Kong Album Sales Awards, presented by the Hong Kong branch of IFPI.

Track listing
 "乖不乖" Guai Bu Guai (Obedient Or Not)
 "曖昧" Ai Mei (Ambiguous) - ending theme song Devil Beside You
 "理想情人" Li Xiang Qing Ren (Ideal Lover) - insert song Devil Beside You
 "只想愛你" Zhi Xiang Ai Ni (Just Wanna Love You)
 "單眼皮" Dan Yan Pi (Single Eyelid)
 "習慣" Xi Guan (Habit)
 "不見" Bu Jian (Disappear)
 "愛情的顏色" Ai Qing De Yan Se (Color Of Love)
 "True Blue" - Astro Boy theme song
 "下一次微笑" Xia Yi Ci Wei Xiao (Next Time Smiling)

Music videos
 "乖不乖" (Obedient Or Not) MV
 "曖昧" (Ambiguous) MV
 "理想情人" (Ideal Lover) MV
 "只想愛你" (Just Wanna Love You) MV
 "單眼皮" (Single Eyelid) MV
 "習慣" (Habit) MV
 "不見" (Disappear) MV
 "愛情的顏色" (Color Of Love) MV
 "下一次微笑" (Next Time Smiling) MV

References

External links
  Rainie Yang@Sony Music Taiwan
  Rainie Yang discography@Sony Music Taiwan

2005 debut albums
Rainie Yang albums
Sony Music Taiwan albums